Llancadle is a rural village south-west of Barry near Rhoose in the Vale of Glamorgan, in Wales.

Llancadle is located near the international airport for Wales, Cardiff International Airport.

It has what used to be a pub named the 'Green Dragon Inn' at the Northern end of the village. The Green Dragon is now a private residential property.

External links
www.geograph.co.uk : photos of Llancadle and surrounding area
 The Green Dragon Inn

Villages in the Vale of Glamorgan